Lodha is a name of various Indian communities and may refer to:
 Lodha people, a tribal people living primarily in the Indian states of West Bengal and Odisha, mostly in the Paschim Medinipur district. A section of the Lodha has converted to Islam, and form a distinct community of Lodha Muslims.
 Lodhi (caste), agriculturalist caste primarily found in Uttar Pradesh and Madhya Pradesh, categorised as Other Backward Class but claim Rajput ties and prefer to be known as "Lodhi-Rajput",
 Oswal, also known as Oswal Lodha, Jain community from Rajasthan.

References

Indian castes
Ethnic groups in India
Scheduled Tribes of India